Lard is an American hardcore punk/industrial band founded in 1988 as a side project by Jello Biafra (vocals; formerly of Dead Kennedys), Al Jourgensen (guitar; of Ministry), Paul Barker (bass; also of Ministry), and Jeff Ward (drums; once a Ministry touring member). Over the years, several other members of Ministry played with Lard, namely Bill Rieflin, Mike Scaccia, and Rey Washam.

Like most of Biafra's work, Lard's songs are angrily political (the War on Drugs is a particularly common theme) but often have a tinge of humor.

Lard has not officially toured and has only performed live a handful of times, mostly around the San Francisco area (where Jello lives and operates his Alternative Tentacles record label). The band played during Ministry's 1988 tour and throughout their 1989–1990 dates, once in Chicago after wrapping the recording of The Last Temptation of Reid, once at the conclusion of a Ministry concert in Los Angeles (March 24, 2003), and at the San Francisco (September 26, 2004), Portland (September 28, 2004) and Seattle (September 29, 2004) dates of Ministry's Evil Doer tour. Because its key members are active with other projects, it is unlikely that the band will tour.

According to a March 2009 interview with Jourgensen, he and Biafra are working on a new Lard album, which was to be recorded in Jourgensen's El Paso studio. However, according to a January 2010 interview with Jello Biafra, he indicated that a new Lard album was unlikely, saying "Me and Al have talked about it for years, but we've never been able to nail down a time to try and put it together.".

According to a 2020 interview Jourgensen said that he and Biafra plan to make a brand new Lard album soon with them emailing songs back and forth.

Discography

Albums

Extended plays

Compilation appearances

References

 

Alternative Tentacles artists
American industrial music groups
American industrial metal musical groups
Industrial rock musical groups
Musical groups established in 1988
Musical groups disestablished in 2000
Hardcore punk groups from Illinois